Megastructures is a documentary television series appearing on the National Geographic Channel in the United States and the United Kingdom, Channel 5 in the United Kingdom, France 5 in France, and 7mate in Australia.

Each episode is an educational look of varying depth into the construction, operation, and staffing of various structures or construction projects, but not ordinary construction products.

Generally containing interviews with designers and project managers, it presents the problems of construction and the methodology or techniques used to overcome obstacles. In some cases (such as the Akashi-Kaikyo Bridge and Petronas Towers) this involved the development of new materials or products that are now in general use within the construction industry.

Megastructures focuses on constructions that are extreme; in the sense that they are the biggest, tallest, longest, or deepest in the world. Alternatively, a project may appear if it had an element of novelty or are a world first (such as Dubai's Palm Islands). This type of project is known as a megaproject.

The series follows similar subjects as the History Channel's Modern Marvels and Discovery Channel's Extreme Engineering, covering areas of architecture, transport, construction and manufacturing.

Episodes

Season 1 (2004)

Season 2 (2005)

Season 3 (2006)

Season 4 (2007–2008)

Season 5 (2009–2010)

Season 6 (2011)

Unknown season

Unknown season 2

Spin-offs

Megastructures: Built from Disaster
 "Megastructures: Built from Disaster – Bridges" // Wednesday, 26 August 2009 8–9pm on Channel 5
 "Megastructures: Built from Disaster – Ships" // Thursday, 3 September 2009 8–9pm on Channel 5
 "Megastructures: Built from Disaster – Tunnels" // Thursday, 10 September 2009 8–9pm on Channel 5
 "Megastructures: Built from Disaster – Stadiums" // Thursday, 24 September 2009 8–9pm on Channel 5
 "Megastructures: Built from Disaster – Trains" // Thursday, 8 October 2009 8–9pm on Channel 5
 "Megastructures: Built from Disaster – Skyscrapers" // Thursday, 15 October 2009 8–9pm on Channel 5

Ancient Megastructures
 "Ancient Megastructures: Chartres Cathedral" // Series 1
 "Ancient Megastructures: The Colosseum" // Series 1
 "Ancient Megastructures: The Great Pyramid" // Series 1
 "Ancient Megastructures: St Paul's Cathedral" // Series 2
 "Ancient Megastructures: Alhambra" // Series 2
 "Ancient Megastructures: Petra" // Series 2
 "Ancient Megastructures: Machu Picchu" // Series 2
 "Ancient Megastructures: Angkor Wat" // Series 2
 "Ancient Megastructures: Istanbul's Hagia Sophia" // Series 2

International broadcasts
In January 2020, Indonesian TV channel, NET interested to broadcasting Megastructures in Indonesia in July 2020.

See also 
Mega Builders
Monster Moves
Ultimate Factories
Nazi Megastructures

References

External links
 Megastructures official site on National Geographic
 
 https://web.archive.org/web/20091119041617/http://www.locatetv.com/tv/ultimate-factories/2105893/episode-guide
 http://www.twofourbroadcast.com/news-250809-megastructures.asp

Megastructures
2004 American television series debuts
2000s American documentary television series
2010s American documentary television series
Channel 5 (British TV channel) original programming
Construction
Documentary television series about industry
Documentary television series about technology
National Geographic (American TV channel) original programming